Futurikon is a French independent production company created in 1996 by Philippe Delarue, the company’s CEO and Producer, and based in Paris. It specializes in the production and international sales of animated programs, feature films and documentaries.

Futurikon acts as both executive producer and line producer of the programs it develops, and is open to co-producing content with other partners.

Most famous for the feature film Minuscule: Valley of the Lost Ants, Futurikon has been involved in several other animations.

Works

Feature films

Animation
Dragon Hunters (2008)
Minuscule: Valley of the Lost Ants (2013)
Minuscule - Mandibles from Far Away (2019)

Live-action
Playground Chronicles (2012)

Animated series
Chronokids (2016)
Brico Club, aka Crafty Kids Club (2012)
Trolls of Troy (2013–2014)
Captain Biceps (2010–2011)
A Cow, A Cat and the Ocean
Dragon Hunters (2006–2012)
Fly Tales (1999)
Gloria, Wilma and Me
How to Draw?
Iron Nose
Kaput and Zösky (2002–2003)
Lucas and Emily
Sweet Little Monsters (2011–2018)
Malo Korrigan (2003)
The Minimighty Kids (2008-2019)
Minuscule (since 2006)
Monster Allergy (2006–2009)
Pop Secret
The Ugly Duckling and Me
Willa's Wild Life (2008–2009)

Documentaries
Audacious
Journey to the West
Terra Magica
This Mute Memory

As distributor
The Ugly Duckling and Me!

References 

Monster Allergy
French animation studios